Patrick Ledoux (born 6 November 1934) is a Belgian film director. He directed 14 films between 1961 and 1979. His 1969 film Klann – grand guignol was entered into the 20th Berlin International Film Festival.

Selected filmography
 Klann – grand guignol (1969)

References

External links

1934 births
Living people
Belgian film directors